Stamford Constituency was a single member constituency in Singapore. It used to exist from 1955 to 1976. 

In 1976, the constituency was abolished. Half of the electorate was moved to Rochore Constituency while the other half split into River Valley and Telok Ayer constituencies.

Member of Parliament

Electoral results

Elections in the 1950s

Historical maps

References

Singaporean electoral divisions